Grellton is an unincorporated community located in the town of Milford, Jefferson County, Wisconsin, United States. The community was named for John F. Grell, an area butter and egg salesman.

Notes

Unincorporated communities in Jefferson County, Wisconsin
Unincorporated communities in Wisconsin